Cardinal Tien College of Healthcare and Management (CTCN) is a private, Roman Catholic, junior college in Xindian District, New Taipei and Sanxing Township, Yilan County, Taiwan.

The college was initially named the Cardinal Tien College of Medicine and Nursing, but it was later renamed the Cardinal Tien College of Healthcare and Management in 2005 to reflect its expanded scope of programs. 

CTCHM offers a range of undergraduate and graduate programs in healthcare and management, including nursing, medical laboratory science, occupational therapy, physical therapy, healthcare management, and long-term care. The college also offers continuing education programs for healthcare professionals.

History
CTCN was originally established in August 1971.

Yilan Campus was operate in 2006.

Faculties
 Department of Cosmetic Applications and Management
 Department of Digital Media Design
 Department of Early Childhood Educare
 Department of Health and Hospitality
 Department of Health Beauty
 Department of Information Management
 Department of Nursing
 Holistic Education Center

Transportation
The college is accessible within walking distance West from Qizhang Station of the Taipei Metro.

And the Yilan Campus has a Kuo-Guang Bus Station (Route 1794A/1794B) connect to TRA Luodong Station.

See also
 List of universities in Taiwan

References

1971 establishments in Taiwan
Universities and colleges in New Taipei
Junior colleges in Taiwan
Technical universities and colleges in Taiwan
Educational institutions established in 1971